The following is a list of squads for each national team competing at the 2018 UEFA Women's Under-19 Championship in Switzerland. Each national team had to submit a squad of 20 players born on or after 1 January 1999.

Group A

Switzerland
Switzerland named their squad on 12 July 2018.

Head coach: Nora Häuptle

Norway
Norway named their squad on 27 June 2018.

Head coach: Nils Lexeröd

Spain
Spain named their squad on 6 July 2018.

Head coach: Jorge Vilda

France
France named their squad on 15 July 2018.

Head coach: Gaëlle Dumas

Group B

Netherlands
Netherlands named their squad on 7 July 2018.

Head coach: Jessica Torny

Denmark
The squad was announced on 20 June 2018.

Head coach: Søren Randa-Boldt

Germany
Germany named their squad on 14 July 2018.

Head coach: Maren Meinert

Italy
Italy named their squad on 16 July 2018.

Head coach: Enrico Sbardella

References

External links
Squads on UEFA.com

squads
UEFA Women's Under-19 Championship squads